Gunnar Andersen (18 March 1890 – 25 April 1968) was a Norwegian footballer and ski jumper. In 1918 he became the first to receive the Egebergs Ærespris, an award presented to Norwegian athletes who excel at two (or more) different sports.

Football career
Andersen was a member of Lyn, and was capped 46 times for Norway, the national record at the time. He participated in two Summer Olympics; Stockholm 1912 and Antwerpen 1920. Captaining the Norwegian football team in 1920, they beat Great Britain and Ireland.

Skiing career
As a ski jumper Gunnar Andersen set a world record when he jumped  in Gustadbakken, Modum, 1912. He represented Lyn here as well.

Ski jumping world records

 Not recognized! However, he stood at world record distance.

References

1890 births
1968 deaths
Norwegian footballers
Norway international footballers
Lyn Fotball players
Norwegian male ski jumpers
Olympic footballers of Norway
Footballers at the 1912 Summer Olympics
Footballers at the 1920 Summer Olympics
Association football midfielders
People from Frogn
Sportspeople from Viken (county)